The canton of Bretoncelles is an administrative division of the Orne department, northwestern France. It was created at the French canton reorganisation which came into effect in March 2015. Its seat is in Bretoncelles.

It consists of the following communes:
 
Berd'huis
Bretoncelles
Cour-Maugis-sur-Huisne
La Madeleine-Bouvet
Moutiers-au-Perche
Perche-en-Nocé
Rémalard-en-Perche
Sablons-sur-Huisne
Saint-Cyr-la-Rosière
Saint-Germain-des-Grois
Saint-Pierre-la-Bruyère
Verrières

References

Cantons of Orne